Philabundance is a non-profit food bank that serves the Philadelphia and Delaware Valley region of Pennsylvania, United States. It is the largest such organization in the region.

History
The organization was founded in 1984 by Pam Lawler. In the year 2005, it merged with The Greater Philadelphia Food Bank, and the new entity operates under the name Philabundance.

Goals
The organization aims to drive hunger from our communities today and end hunger forever.

Organization
Philabundance serves 90,000 people each week, 30% of whom are children, 15% of whom are seniors, and others served include students, the working poor, veterans and single parents. It has its own programs, as well as a network of 350 agencies, including emergency kitchens, shelters and soup kitchens. As of 2017, 1 in 8 people in the U.S. face hunger while in our area, that number is 1 in 5, making hunger a crisis in the Delaware Valley.

Philabundance works with local grocers and farmers to rescue perfectly good food that would otherwise go to waste; in 2016, it rescued 10 million pounds of food for its neighbors in need. The organization also hosts events alongside the Greater Philadelphia Coalition Against Hunger.

Trends
Clients Who Volunteer - Many of Philabundance's 15,000 volunteers are also clients, especially at its Fresh for All program. These volunteers spend 2–3 hours a week distributing food to others, while they themselves need help, and are allowed to take the same amount of food as those attending the program.

Hungry Students – Due to rising tuition, and the rules around qualifications for SNAP benefits, many college campuses are seeing a rise in the number of hungry students enrolled. As a result, many schools are opening pantries on campus to serve those in need. Philabundance's partner, the Chester County Food Bank, and other Feeding America food banks have partner with colleges to ensure this population has enough food to survive and thrive in school. Philabundance will soon follow suit.

Programs
 Fresh For All Program - To help families and individuals in need gain access to fresh vegetables and fruits, Philabundance operates Fresh For All Program at nine locations in Pennsylvania and New Jersey.
 Senior Boxes Program - Gives USDA-sponsored food boxes to approximately 5,000 low-income senior citizens.
 Philabundance Community Kitchen - A culinary, vocational job training program that teaches low-income and unemployed individuals life and job-readiness skills.
 Grocers Against Hunger- a food rescue program that allows participating grocers to donate surplus inventory to Philabundance. The food is later distributed to clients through direct service programs. In 2015, the program saved 10 million pounds of produce that would have otherwise gone to waste.
 KidsBites - The KidsBites initiative provides access to nutritious food in low-income areas for children and their families to help ensure that kids in our service area have the food they need to thrive and grow. Since its inception, KidsBites has provided almost 250,000 pounds of food to children and their families. To meet the needs and size of different communities, Philabundance offers several program models: Mobile pantry; BackPacks; and LunchBoxes.

Contributions Received
A multitude of generous individuals, foundations and corporations support Philabundance. Following are some of the largest annual contributions:
  Phans Feeding Families: The Philadelphia Phillies and the Citizens Bank, sponsor the annual Phans Feeding Families program, which consists of a night at the ballpark at which there are raffles and fundraisers to benefit Philabundance, as well as food collections at AT&T station and Citizens Bank Park. As part of its support of Phans, Citizen Bank makes an annual donation of $40,000 to support Philabundance' KidsBites initiative.
 SEPTA Stop Hunger at Your Station - The Southeastern Pennsylvania Transportation Authority (SEPTA) supports Philabundance annually, by collecting food at more than 40 SEPTA stations. Stations also collected money, leading to tens of thousands of meals for our neighbors in need.
 93.3 WMMR's Preston & Steve Camp Out for Hunger – Every year since 1998, Preston & Steve hold a five-day "Camp Out for Hunger" event – most recently, at Xfinity Live! This is the largest single-location food drive in the county, raising more than 2.6 million pounds of food and $200,000 in 2019's drive and over 14 million pounds in since its inception. The event was aimed at increasing hunger awareness, as well as collecting food for Philabundance. The event featured popular bands and distinguished guests showing their support for Philabundance. Preston and Steve camp at the spot in a trailer all through the week.
 6abc's Holiday Food Drive: Each year, 6abc and partners Dunkin Donuts and ACME raise food, funds and awareness of Philabundance from Thanksgiving through the New Year. Elements of the campaign include donations at ACME stores, a 6abc telethon and Dunkin Donuts in-store promotions. 
 Toyota Hauls Away Hunger: The Toyota Dealership Association of the Delaware Valley holds a literal food drive each December in which more than 50 Tundras caravan from Philabundance's warehouse in North Philly to Citizen Bank Park parking lot, hauling food to help feed those in need.
 Fraud Street Run: Two Philadelphia runners, Chip and Jeff of the Junk Miles podcast, organised a charity run inspired by the Four Seasons Total Landscaping press conference.

See also

 Food salvage
 Food rescue
 Food waste
 List of food banks

References
 Notes

External links
 Philabundance.org

Food banks in Delaware
Non-profit organizations based in Philadelphia
Food banks in Maryland
Food banks in Pennsylvania
501(c)(3) organizations